(lit. "Private Bakalea High School") is a 2012 Japanese television series. Written by AKB48's producer Yasushi Akimoto, this television series featured Johnny's Hey! Say! JUMP member Yuya Takaki, and members of then Johnny's Jr. now known as SixTONES and AKB48's Team 4.

Plot
Bakada High School is a well-known Yankī (delinquent) school, where students only know how to fight. On the other hand, Cattleya High School is an exclusive girls' school meant for the rich, where students are very refined. One day, it was announced that Bakada would merge into Cattleya to form Cattleya No.2 High School. However, students from Bakada and Cattleya were unable to accept each other, since they come from vastly different backgrounds.

But over time, the two repelling groups slowly get to understand each other better.

Cast

Bakada High School
 Shintaro Morimoto as Tatsuya Sakuragi
 Hokuto Matsumura as Tetsuya Asada
 Yuya Takaki as Shohei Tatsunami
 Taiga Kyomoto as Maya Terakawa
 Juri Tanaka as Soichi Noguchi
 Jesse as Yuki Satonaka
 Yugo Kochi as Makoto Jimbo

Cattleya No.1 High School
 Haruka Shimazaki as Fumie Shingyoji
 Mina Ōba as Saya Kokyu
 Kaoru Mitsumune as Sayuri Tokimune
 Mariya Nagao as Mana Honjo
 Marina Kobayashi as Reika Zaizen
 Haruka Shimada as An Miyata
 Mariko Nakamura as Kaori Shinohara
 Toshiya Miyata as Junichi Koba
 Takaya Kamikawa as Haruki Minamoto

Others
 Rie Kitahara as Momoko
 Ryohei Abe as Hiroi Azuma
 Dai Watanabe as Saionji Ryo
 Hiroki Uchi as Ren Sakuragi
 Yokoyama Yui as Ris

Episodes

Production
Shiritsu Bakaleya Koukou was first announced by AKB48 producer Yasushi Akimoto on 1 March 2012. This drama features members from the female idol group AKB48 and male idol group Johnny's Jr., with this being the first time where members of AKB48 and Johnny's Jr. collaborate in a television drama. Most of the cast members featured in this show had no prior experience in acting.

It was subsequently revealed that Shiritsu Bakaleya Koukou would receive a movie sequel. Members of the original cast will reprise their roles in the sequel. This movie sequel was scheduled to be released in the Japanese box office in October 2012.

References

External links
  

Japanese drama television series
Japanese high school television series
2012 Japanese television series debuts
2012 Japanese television series endings
Nippon TV dramas
Television series about teenagers